Joseph Maria Benedikt zu Fürstenberg-Stühlingen (9 January 1758 – 24 June 1796) was a German nobleman and from 1783 until his death the seventh reigning prince of Fürstenberg. He was born in Donaueschingen, where he also died. He was the eldest son of Joseph Wenzel zu Fürstenberg and his wife Maria Josepha von Waldburg-Scheer-Trauchburg. He died childless and was succeeded by his younger brother Karl Joachim.

Fürstenberg (princely family)
1758 births
1796 deaths